Daniel O'Leary may refer to:

Daniel O'Leary (chemist), American chemist
Daniel O'Leary (mobster) "Danny" (died 1928), Philadelphia mobster
Daniel O'Leary (Irish nationalist politician) (1875–1954), Irish Parliamentary Party MP for West Cork (1916–18)
Daniel Florence O'Leary (c.1802–1854), Irish-born South American brigadier general
Daniel O'Leary (Fine Gael politician) (1877–1951), Irish Cumann na nGaedhael / Fine Gael politician from Cork
Dan O'Leary (American football) (born 1977), American football player 
Dan O'Leary, baseball player
K. Daniel O'Leary (born 1940), American psychologist